TMX may refer to:

 TMX Group, owner of Toronto Stock Exchange and Montreal Derivatives Exchange
 Toronto Stock Exchange (TSX)
 Montreal Exchange (MX)
 Telmex, NYSE ticker symbol
 Translation Memory eXchange file format
 Transaction Management eXecutive, old NCR system 
 Tickle Me Elmo#TMX, a Sesame Street doll
 Kodak T-MAX 100 film edge marking
 Tandem Mirror Experiment
 TMX Finance, US company
 Tamoxifen, breast cancer medication
 Trans Mountain Expansion Project in Trans Mountain Pipeline